Chetone catilina is a moth of the family Erebidae. It was described by Pieter Cramer in 1775. It is found in French Guiana, Venezuela and Suriname.

Subspecies
Chetone catilina catilina (Suriname)
Chetone catilina angustilineata (Fleming, 1949) (Venezuela)

References

Chetone
Moths described in 1775
Taxa named by Pieter Cramer